Xyris is a genus of flowering plants, the yelloweyed grasses, in the yellow-eyed-grass family.  The genus counts over 250 species, widespread over much of the world, with the center of distribution in the Guianas.

The leaves are mostly distichous, linear, flat, and thin or round with a conspicuous sheath at the base. They are arranged in a basal aggregation. The small, yellow flowers are borne on a spherical or cylindrical spike or head (inflorescence). Each flower grows from the axil of a leathery bract. The fruit is a nonfleshy, dehiscent capsule.  In Xyris complanata, a single flower bud on the spike appears in the morning, and expands into a conspicuous flower during the afternoon hours.

The APG IV system, of 2016, places the genus in family Xyridaceae, into the order Poales in the clade commelinids, in the monocots.

Species include:

References

External links
 Xyris in the Flora of North America

 
Poales genera